Lewellen may refer to:

Lewellen (surname)
Lewellen, Nebraska
Lewellen House
Lewellen State Aid Bridge